The Missouri-Pacific Depot-Clarksville is a historic railroad station between Cherry and Main Streets in Clarksville, Arkansas.  It is a single-story masonry structure, built in 1910 by the Missouri-Pacific Railroad in the Mediterranean style.  It is basically rectangular, with a projecting cross-gabled telegrapher's booth on the track side, which is topped by a distinctive parapeted gable. The roof has extended eaves supported by large Italianate brackets.

The building was listed on the National Register of Historic Places in 1992.

See also
National Register of Historic Places listings in Johnson County, Arkansas

References

Railway stations on the National Register of Historic Places in Arkansas
National Register of Historic Places in Johnson County, Arkansas
Railway stations in the United States opened in 1910
Clarksville
Mediterranean Revival architecture in Arkansas
Former railway stations in Arkansas